Buthus kunti is a scorpion species found in Cyprus.

References 

 

Buthidae
Animals described in 2011
Scorpions of Europe
Endemic fauna of Cyprus